Jordan Anthony James (born 2 July 2004) is a professional footballer who plays as a midfielder for  club Birmingham City. He made his senior debut as a 17-year-old on 2 November 2021. Born in England to a Welsh father, James has represented both Wales and England at youth levels and received his first call-up to the Wales senior team in September 2022.

Early life
James was born in Hereford, where he attended Whitecross Hereford High School. His father, Tony James, played in the Football League as a defender for Burton Albion, Newport County and Hereford United. James joined Birmingham City at pre-Academy level and took up a two-year scholarship in July 2020. According to the then head of professional development phase Mike Dodds, James was "technically very good and versatile, [and] can play in both offensive and defensive areas of the pitch."

Club career
James was a member of the Birmingham under-18 team that finished as runners-up in the Northern Section of their league, and came from behind against Charlton Athletic's U18 in the national semi-finals only to lose to a last-minute goal. As well as playing for the under-18s, he started several matches for Birmingham's under-23 team in the 2021–22 Premier League 2. He trained occasionally with the first team, and was given a squad number and named in the matchday squad for the EFL Championship match at home to Bristol City on 2 November. With only a few minutes left, Birmingham led 3–0, and the 17-year-old James came on in place of Jordan Graham to make his senior debut. Manager Lee Bowyer said "He came on today, ran around, didn't give the ball away, competed and when he passed, he passed it with a purpose."

With both Ryan Woods and Gary Gardner suspended, James made his first start against Blackpool on 27 November, partnering Ivan Šunjić in central midfield in a 3–4–1–2 formation. He played the whole game, headed Kristian Pedersen's cross into the path of Lukas Jutkiewicz who scored the 81st-minute winner, and was the Birmingham Mail man of the match. On the same day, James signed his first professional contract.

International career
James is eligible to represent both England, where he was born, and his father's native country of Wales. He came through the 2018 Cymru Cup, a training and pre-selection camp for 14-year-olds, to make his under-15 debut for Wales during the 2018–19 season. He played for Wales U16 in 2019–20, attended under-17 training camps in 2020–21, and made his under-18s debut against England in September 2021.

James was called up to the England under-20 squad for matches against Poland and Germany in March 2022, and appeared in both games as a very late substitute. 

James was named in a 26-man initial squad for Wales under-21's friendly against Austria in September 2022. However, following an injury to Joe Allen, James was added to the senior Wales squad for the Nations League matches against Belgium and Poland. He did not play, but he and fellow uncapped player Oli Cooper were named to travel as backup to the senior Wales squad at the 2022 World Cup in Qatar in November.

Career statistics

References

2004 births
Living people
Sportspeople from Hereford
Footballers from Herefordshire
English footballers
Welsh footballers
Wales youth international footballers
England youth international footballers
Association football midfielders
Birmingham City F.C. players
English Football League players
English people of Welsh descent